Arab Rugby Federation, is the governing body of rugby union in Arab World. Founded in 2012, the Union today has 14 member unions in countries across Arab World.

History
The Arab Rugby Federation was established on Monday, 8 October 2012 in Tunisia, and its permanent headquarters were in Tunis, and the goal was to promote and develop the game of rugby and raise its level in the Arab world.

On 1 October 2015, the UAE Rugby Federation held an extraordinary (emergency) general assembly in Dubai in order to revive the work of the Arab Rugby Federation. The United Arab Emirates.
Mr. Qais Abdullah Al Dhalei was elected unanimously as president, and Dubai become the permanent executive headquarters of the Arab Rugby Federation, which is the same as the headquarters of the elected president in the United Arab Emirates.

Members
There are 14 members in the Arab Rugby Federation.

Members who are part of Rugby Africa:

Members who are part of Asia Rugby:

Competitions
Tournaments run by the Arab Rugby Federation include:

Senior Men
Men XV
No competition
Men VII
Arab Rugby Sevens Men's Tournament

Senior Women
Women XV
No competition
Women VII
Arab Rugby Sevens Women's Tournament

References

External links
ARF official website

Rug
Rug
 
Sports organizations established in 2012
2012 establishments